This discography of jazz saxophonist Julian "Cannonball" Adderley includes albums released under his own name and albums to which he made significant contributions.

Discography

As leader

As sideman 

With Nat Adderley
 Introducing Nat Adderley (Wing, 1955)
 To the Ivy League from Nat (EmArcy, 1956)
 That's Right! (EmArcy, 1960)
 In the Bag (Jazzland, 1962)
 Soul Zodiac (Capitol, 1972)
 Soul of the Bible (Capitol, 1972)
 Double Exposure (Prestige, 1975)

With Miles Davis
 Milestones (Columbia, 1958)
 Miles & Monk at Newport (Columbia, 1964) – live. also released on Miles Davis at Newport 1955-1975: The Bootleg Series Vol. 4.
 Porgy and Bess (Columbia, 1959) – recorded in 1958
 Kind of Blue (Columbia, 1959)
 Jazz at the Plaza (Columbia, 1973) – live recorded in 1958
 1958 Miles (Columbia, 1974)– recorded in 1958

With Ray Brown
 Ray Brown with the All-Star Big Band (Verve, 1962)
 Two for the Blues (Verve, 1966)

With others
 Kenny Clarke, Bohemia After Dark (Savoy, 1955)
 Sarah Vaughan, In the Land of Hi-Fi (EmArcy, 1955)
 Dinah Washington, In the Land of Hi-Fi (EmArcy, 1956)
 Milt Jackson, Plenty, Plenty Soul (Atlantic, 1957)
 Louis Smith, Here Comes Louis Smith (Blue Note, 1958) – credited as "Buckshot La Funke"
 Gil Evans, New Bottle Old Wine (World Pacific, 1958)
 John Benson Brooks, Alabama Concerto (Riverside, 1958)
 Machito, Kenya (Roulette, 1958)
 Paul Chambers, Go (Vee-Jay, 1959)
 Philly Joe Jones, Drums Around the World (Riverside, 1959)
 Jon Hendricks, A Good Git-Together (World Pacific, 1959)
 Jimmy Heath, Really Big! (Riverside, 1960)
 Sam Jones, The Chant (Riverside, 1961)
 Eddie "Cleanhead" Vinson, Back Door Blues (Riverside, 1962)
 Oscar Peterson, Bursting Out with the All-Star Big Band! (1962)
 Joe Williams, Joe Williams Live (Fantasy, 1973)
 Gene Ammons, Gene Ammons and Friends at Montreux (Prestige, 1973)
 David Axelrod, Heavy Axe (Fantasy, 1974)
 Raul de Souza, Colors (Milestone, 1975) – recoded in 1974

As a producer
 The Sound of the Wide Open Spaces!!!! (1960) - David Newman & James Clay
 A Portrait of Thelonious (1961) - Bud Powell
 Tribute To Cannonball (1961) - Don Byas & Bud Powell

Compilations 
 Discoveries (1955) - compiles alternate takes from Presenting Cannonball Adderley and Kenny Clarke's Bohemia After Dark 
 Cannonball Adderley Greatest Hits (1962) 
 The Japanese Concerts (1975) - compiles Autumn Leaves & Nippon Soul
 The Best of Cannonball Adderley: The Capitol Years (1991)
 Deep Groove! The Best of Cannonball Adderley (1994)
 Sophisticated Swing: The EmArcy Small Group Sessions (1995) - compiles Sophisticated Swing, Cannonball Enroute, Cannonball's Sharpshooters, & Nat Adderley's To the Ivy League from Nat
 Greatest Hits: The Riverside Years (1998)
 Ultimate Cannonball Adderley (1999) compiled by Joe Zawinul
 Cannonball Adderley's Finest Hour (2001)
 The Definitive Cannonball Adderley (2002)
 Walk Tall: The David Axelrod Years (Stateside, 2006)[2CD]

References
Cannonball Adderley Discography Project accessed November 5, 2009
The Cannonball Adderley Rendez-vous accessed November 5, 2009

 
Jazz discographies

Discographies of American artists